Dhumbadiya  is a major village in Jalore district of Rajasthan state. It is a major village of Bagoda Tehsil. It is located 7 km from Bagoda and 32 km from Bhinmal town. Nearest Railway station is Marwar Bhinmal which is 32 km from Dhumbadiya.

References 

Villages in Jalore district